Dangsarak (also Romanized as Dengesarak; also known as Dengesarak-e Do) is a village in Miandorud-e Kuchak Rural District, in the Central District of Sari County, Mazandaran Province, Iran. At the 2006 census, its population was 1,176, in 335 families.

References 

Populated places in Sari County